"Dragnet" is an instrumental theme from the radio and television show of the same name. It was composed by Walter Schumann for the radio show, and was also used on the subsequent television series and later syndication of the TV series under the name "Badge 714". The theme is in two parts: an opening signature "Main Title" (the ominous "Dum - - - de - DUM - DUM") and the "Dragnet March" used over the end credits.

Popular chart hit versions were recorded by Ray Anthony and his Orchestra (1953) and The Art of Noise (1987).

Film and television composer Nathan Scott, who began orchestrating for Schumann beginning in 1952, later became Dragnet'''s second composer following Schumann's departure from the series.

 Authorship dispute 
After the theme became a chart hit, the publishers of the score for the 1946 film version of The Killers composed by Miklós Rózsa challenged the authorship of the copyright of the Dragnet "Main Title". They contended that Walter Schumann had visited the sound stage in 1946 when Miklós Rózsa was recording "The Killers", and had reused the melody of a cue for that film known as "Danger Ahead". A settlement between publishers resolved the case by allowing both composers and publishers to share the royalties for the short opening signature "Main Title", which became known as "Danger Ahead" after that. The "Dragnet March" remained the exclusive composition of Schumann.

Ray Anthony version

The 1953 recording by Ray Anthony and his Orchestra sold over 500,000 copies in the US and rocketed Ray Anthony to popularity. It was available as both a 45rpm 7-inch vinyl record and a 78rpm 10-inch shellac record.  It reached number three on the Billboard Hot 100 and spent two weeks in the UK chart (December 10, 1953 and January 14, 1954), peaking at number seven.

The Art of Noise version

The 1987 version by The Art of Noise was an international hit, and won the 1987 Grammy Award for Best Rock Instrumental Performance. It was used as the theme music for the 1987 film version of Dragnet based on the TV show.

A new version was released the following year, "Dragnet (The '88 Mix)".

Reception

Evan Cater for AllMusic describes the 12-inch single as "a catchy mesh of orchestral samples, synthesized noise and clips of dialogue from the film."

Chart performance

The Art of Noise version reached number 60 in the UK, number 84 in the Netherlands, number 25 in New Zealand and number 29 in Switzerland. "Dragnet (The '88 Mix)" reached number 90 in the UK.

Other uses of the theme

The theme has been used as a leitmotif for police in movies, such What's so Bad about Feeling Good (1968), without a need to establish it earlier.

A parody of the theme opened the 1967 Eric Burdon and The Animals hit "San Franciscan Nights". A sample of it was used in the 1973 song "Armed and Extremely Dangerous" by First Choice.

The opening signature was used in the theme song for the 1987 TV series Simon and the Witch.Mathnet, the closing segment of Square One TV that parodied Dragnet, also used the theme for its opening.

The 2003 Dick Wolf-produced version of Dragnet used a modified version of the "Danger Ahead" theme composed by Mike Post.

The opening signature is frequently played during NHL hockey games by the home team (Detroit is one example) whenever a member of the opposing team has drawn a penalty.

A popular variant of the theme is used as the jingle for Tums antacid, with the melody vocalized as "Tum-ta-tum-tum Tums".

Ed Norton would often go "Dum-de-dum-dum!" whenever he and Ralph Kramden found themselves in trouble on The Honeymooners''.

References

External links
  (Art of Noise official channel)
ClassicThemes Page about the Dragnet TV series and theme music

1953 songs
Dragnet (franchise)
Television drama theme songs
Art of Noise songs
1950s instrumentals
China Records singles